Aniruddh or Anirudh is an Indian masculine given name that derives from the name of the Hindu mythological character Aniruddha, the grandson of Krishna. Aniruddha is also used as one of the names Vishnu. The meaning of the Sanskrit word is "unobstructed", "self-willed", "unstoppable", "undefeatable" or "invincible".

List of people

With the given name 
 Aniruddha Brahmarayar (10th century), Chola minister
 Aniruddha Mahathera (1915–2003), Nepalese Buddhist monk and religious leader
 Anirudh Lal Nagar (1930–2014), Indian econometrician
 Sir Anerood Jugnauth (1930–2021), President of Mauritius
 Anirudh Agarwal (born 1949), Indian actor
 Anirudh Singh (activist) (born 1950), Fiji Indian scientist and social critic
 Aniruddha Roy Chowdhury (born 1964), Indian Bengali-language film director
 Aniruddha Bahal (born c. 1967), Indian writer
 Aniruddha Oak (born 1973), Indian cricketer
 Aniruddha Jatkar (born 1974), Indian actor, singer, scriptwriter, filmmaker and social entrepreneur.
 Aniruddh Singh, Indian television actor
 Aniruddha Knight (born 1980), Indian-American Bharatanatyam artist
 Aniruddha Maheshwari  (born 1984), Indian Payments Expert
 Anirudh Dave (born 1986), Indian television actor
 Anirudha Srikkanth (born 1987), an Indian cricketer
 Aniruddha Godbole  (born 1987), Top Indian Marketer
 Anirudh Ravichander (born 1990), Indian film composer
 Aniruddha Chakravarty, Indian military commander
 Aniruddha M. Gole, Indian Canadian professor of electrical engineering
 Anirudh Iyer, Indian filmmaker

Others 
 pen name of Bangladesh journalist Santosh Gupta
 Balchander Anirudh (born 1994), Indian cricketer

References 

Indian masculine given names